"Oasis" is Do As Infinity's third single, released in 2000.This song was used in a commercial for Kanebo's"T'ESTIMO" cosmetics line.

This song was included in the band's compilation albums Do the Best and Do the A-side.

Track listing
"Oasis"
"Sell..."
"Oasis" (Instrumental)
"Sell..." (Instrumental)
"Wings" (Free Live 100 at Shibuya Public Hall)
"Heart" (3SV Remix)
"Heart" (Chromatic Mix)

Chart positions

External links
 "Oasis" at Avex Network
 "Oasis" at Oricon

2000 singles
Do As Infinity songs
Songs written by Dai Nagao
2000 songs
Song recordings produced by Seiji Kameda